Coming from Insanity is a 2019 Nigerian crime drama film directed and written by Akinyemi Sebastian Akinropo. It stars Gabriel Afolayan, Damilola Adegbite, Dakore Akande, Wale Ojo and Bolanle Ninalowo.

The film was released on 14 June 2019 and premiered on Netflix on September 18, 2020.

Plot 
Coming from Insanity tells the story of 12-year-old boy Kossi (Gabriel Afolayan) with virtuoso level insight, who was trafficked into Lagos from Togo. He winds up with the Martins (Wale Ojo and Dakore Akande), as an houseboy and grew to become a member of their family. He later teamed up with some other friends to make his own money and that put him on the radar of the EFCC.

Cast 

 Gabriel Afolayan as Kossi
 Damilola Adegbite as Oyin Martins 
 Dakore Akande as Mrs. Martins 
 Wale Ojo as Mr. Martins 
 Bolanle Ninalowo as Rocky
 Odunlade Adekola as cab driver
 Sharon Ooja as Sonia 
 Sani Musa Danja as Abubakar  
 Adeolu Adefarasin as Emmanuel  
 Udoka Oyeka as Toye
 Sambasa Nzeribe as Detective Hammed
 Tina Mba as Captain

Awards 
It was nominated for the best first feature narrative in the 2020 Pan African Film Festival and winner of the Audience choice award best feature film at the Pressplay Film festival 2019.

See also 

 List of Nigerian films of 2019

References

External links 

 
 

2019 films
2019 crime drama films
English-language Netflix original films
Hood films
English-language Nigerian films
Nigerian crime drama films
2010s English-language films
2010s American films